William Hogan (born 1937) is an American novelist and film producer.

Life
Hogan was born in Kansas City and grew up in California.  He has graduate degrees in English, theology, and philosophy.  He has worked as a high school English teacher, a television executive, and movie producer.

Works
Hogan is best known for his coming-of-age novel The Quartzsite Trip (Atheneum Books, 1980).  The book, set largely in the town of Quartzsite, Arizona, is a cult classic of which Kirkus Reviews said, "[T]here's an innocence of time and culture laid out here that is sweet and true: the trip is irresistible, as good as American Graffiti, and maybe--for its sculpted, more than nostalgic shape--even better."

His second novel, entitled The Year of the Mongoose (Atheneum, 1981) was not nearly as well-received, with one critic dubbing it "a tired, toothless, virtually plotless satire on the network TV biz".

Hogan was also a partner in Ten-Four Productions, a movie company based in California in the 1970s and 1980s.  The company's work includes Rainbow, a made-for-television biopic about actress Judy Garland, and one season of the television series Harper Valley PTA.

References

1937 births
20th-century American novelists
American film producers
Living people